Bastilla myops is a moth of the family Noctuidae first described by Achille Guenée in 1852. It is most commonly found on Java and Bali.

It was formerly considered to be a synonym of Bastilla joviana.

References

Bastilla (moth)
Moths described in 1852